Luke, Rank Impersonator is a 1916 American short comedy film starring Harold Lloyd.

Cast
 Harold Lloyd - Luke
 Bebe Daniels
 Snub Pollard
 Charles Stevenson - (as Charles E. Stevenson)
 Billy Fay
 Fred C. Newmeyer
 Sammy Brooks
 Harry Todd
 Bud Jamison
 Margaret Joslin - (as Mrs. Harry Todd)
 Earl Mohan
 Jewel Mason
 Peggy Heinse
 Estelle Short - (as Estella Short)
 Vesta Marlowe
 Peggy Prevost - (as Marjory Prevost)
 Villatta Singley
 Madeline Vintin

See also
 Harold Lloyd filmography

References

External links

1916 films
1916 comedy films
Silent American comedy films
American black-and-white films
Films directed by Hal Roach
Lonesome Luke films
1916 short films
American silent short films
American comedy short films
1910s American films